Muslim Rajputs are the descendants of Rajputs in the northern regions of the Indian subcontinent who are followers of Islam. They converted from Hinduism to Islam from the medieval period onwards, retaining Hindu surnames such as Rana and Chauhan. Today, Muslim Rajputs can be found in present-day Northern India and Pakistan. They are further divided into different clans.

History

The term Rajput is traditionally applied to the original Suryavanshi, Chandravanshi and Agnivanshi clans, who claimed to be Kshatriya in the Hindu varna system.

Conversion to Islam and ethos
There are recorded instances of recent conversions of Rajputs to Islam in Western Uttar Pradesh, Khurja tahsil of Bulandshahr.

Upon their conversion from Hinduism to Islam, the Rajputs maintained many of their Hindu customs. Muslim Rajputs often retain common social practices (such as purdah [seclusion of women], which is generally followed by Hindu and Muslim Rajputs).

The British-era ethnographer Denzil Ibbetson noted that “Rajput” in the Punjab region of what is now Pakistan, was used as a title rather than as a “ethnological fact” with tribes like Jats being able to gain the Rajput title after rising to royal rank.

Despite the difference in faith, where the question has arisen of common Rajput honour, there have been instances where both Muslim and Hindu Rajputs have united together against threats from external ethnic groups.

Muslim Rajput dynasties

Kharagpur Raj

The Kharagpur Raj was a Muslim Kindwar Rajput chieftaincy in modern-day Munger district of Bihar. Raja Sangram Singh led a rebellion against the Mughal authorities and was subsequently defeated and executed. His son, Toral Mal, was made to convert to Islam and renamed as Roz Afzun. Roz Afzun was a loyal Commander to the Emperors Jahangir and Shah Jahan and Jahangir referred to him as his "favourite" commander in the empire. Another prominent chieftain of this dynasty was Tahawar Singh who played an active role in the Mughal expedition against the nearby Cheros of Palamu.

Muzaffarid dynasty

The Gujarat Sultanate was an independent Muslim kingdom established in the early 15th century by the Muzaffarid dynasty in Gujarat. The Muzafarrid Dynasty was founded by Sultan Zafar Khan Muzaffar, who was probably a Tanka Rajput from Punjab.

Samma dynasty 

In 1339 Jam Unar founded a Sindhi Muslim Rajput Samma dynasty and challenged the Sultans of Delhi. He used the title of the Sultan of Sindh. The Samma tribe reached its peak during the reign of Jam Nizamuddin II (also known by the nickname Jám Nindó). During his reign from 1461 to 1509, Nindó greatly expanded the new capital of Thatta and its Makli hills, which replaced Debal. He patronized Sindhi art, architecture and culture. The Samma had left behind a popular legacy especially in architecture, music and art. Important court figures included the poet Kazi Kadal, Sardar Darya Khan, Moltus Khan, Makhdoom Bilawal and the theologian Kazi Kaadan. However, Thatta which was a port city unlike garrison towns, it could not mobilize large armies against the Arghun and Tarkhan Mongol invaders, who killed many regional Sindhi Mirs and Amirs loyal to the Samma. Some parts of Sindh still remained under the Sultans of Delhi and the ruthless Arghuns and the Tarkhans sacked Thatta during the rule of Jam Ferozudin.

Khanzada dynasty

Mewat was a kingdom in Rajputana with its capital at Alwar ruled by a Khanzada Mewati Rajput dynasty during the period of the Delhi Sultanate in India. Raja Hassan Khan Mewati was represented the Meo Khanzada in Battle of Khanwa.
Mewat was covered over a wide area, it included Hathin tehsil, Nuh district, Tijara, Gurgaon, Kishangarh Bas, Ramgarh, Laxmangarh Tehsils Aravalli Range  in Alwar district and Pahari, Nagar, Kaman tehsils in Bharatpur district of Rajasthan and also some part of Mathura district of Uttar Pradesh. The last ruler of Mewat, Hasan Khan Mewati was killed in the battle of Khanwa against the Mughal emperor Babur. The Meo Khanzadas were descended from Hindu Yadu Rajputs.

Lalkhani Nawabs

The Lalkhanis are a Muslim Rajput community and a sub-clan of the Bargujars. They were the Nawabs of various estates in Western Uttar Pradesh. These included Chhatari and neighbouring regions including parts of Aligarh and Bulandshahr.

Langah dynasty

The Langah Sultanate was a kingdom which emerged after the decline of Delhi Sultanate in the Punjab region. The capital of the Sultanate was the city of Multan in south Punjab. The founding Langah tribe is said to have had either Muslim Rajputor Baloch origins.

Soomra dynasty 

After the decline of Habbari dynasty, the Abbasid Caliphate then appointed Al Khafif from Samarra; 'Soomro' means 'of Samarra' in Sindhi. The new governor of Sindh was to create a better, stronger and stable government. Once he became the governor, he allotted several key positions to his family and friends; thus Al-Khafif or Sardar Khafif Soomro formed the Soomro Dynasty in Sindh; and became its first ruler. Until the Siege of Baghdad (1258) the Soomro dynasty was the Abbasid Caliphate's functionary in Sindh, but after that it became independent. The Soomros were first native Muslim dynasty in Sindh with probable Parmar Rajput origin. Along with Rajput origins, the Soomros also claimed Arab ancestry.

Qaimkhanis of Fatehpur-Jhunjhunu
The Qaimkhanis were a Muslim Rajput dynasty who were notable for ruling the Fatehpur-Jhunjhunu region in Rajasthan from the 1300s to the 1700s. They were descended from Hindu Chauhan Rajputs, though as also stated by the historian Dirk Kolff the Qaimkhani have Turkic origins.

Mayi chiefs
The Mayi clan were the chieftains of the Narhat-Samai (Hisua) chieftaincy in modern-day Nawada district in South Bihar. The founder of the Mayi clan was Nuraon Khan who arrived in Bihar in the 17th century. His descendants were Azmeri and Deyanut who were granted zamindari rights over six parganas by the Mughal authorities. Deyanut's son was Kamgar Khan who expanded his land by attacking and plundering neighbouring zamindars. Kamgar Khan also led numerous revolts against the Mughals and attempted to assert the Mayi's independence. His descendant was Iqbal Ali Khan who took part in the 1781 revolt in Bihar against the British however his revolt failed and Mayi's lost much of their land.

Bengal
Rajput communities began settling in Bengal during the Sultanate period where they were given high ranks in the Bengal government. One notable example is of Bhagirath of Ayodhya, who belonged to the Hindu Bais clan, who was appointed as the Dewan of Sultan Ghiyasuddin Mahmud Shah. His son, Kalidas Gajdani embraced Sunni Islam through the guidance of Ibrahim Danishmand and became known as Sulaiman Khan. Bhagirath's grandson, Isa Khan, grew to become the chief of Bengal's Baro-Bhuiyan confederacy which posed as a threat to the Mughals who wanted to conquer Bengal. The diwans of Mymensingh and Dhaka during the 19th-century were said to be the descendants of Muslim Rajputs.

Notable people
Muhammad Ahmad Said Khan Chhatari
Jam Tamachi (Jam Khairuddin) (1367–1379 AD) or Jam Khairuddin bin Jam Unad, a famous sultan of the Samma dynasty
Jam Nizamuddin II (866–914 AH, 1461–1508 AD), the most famous sultan of the Samma dynasty
Jam Ferozudin (1508–1527) or Jam Feruz bin Jam Nizam, last ruler of the Samma dynasty 926 AH (1519 AD)
Raja Hasan Khan Mewati, was the ruler of Mewat 
Tufail Ahmad Khan,  Pakistani politician affiliated with the Pakistan Muslim League 
Isa Khan, was one of the Baro Bhuiyans (twelve landlords) of 16th century Bengal. 
Rai Bular Bhatti, he donated 18,750 acres of land to Guru Nanak Ji.
Dulla Bhatti, who rebel against Akbar.
Mahmud Begada

See also
 List of Rajput dynasties
 Sindhi-Sipahi

References

Social groups of Bihar
Social groups of Pakistan
Sindhi tribes
Social groups of India
Islam in India
Rajputs
Muslim communities of India
Muslim communities of Uttar Pradesh
Social groups of Rajasthan